Deamia chontalensis is a species of flowering plant in the family Cactaceae, native to southwestern Mexico and Guatemala. It has sprawling or pendent branched stems and fragrant white flowers.

Description
They branch at the nodes between the segments.

Taxonomy
The species was first described by Edward Johnston Alexander in 1836, as Nyctocereus chontalensis. It was later placed in the genera Selenicereus and Strophocactus, but molecular phylogenetic studies in 2017 and 2018 showed that it belonged to a separate clade, and it was transferred to the revived genus Deamia. , this transfer had not been accepted by Plants of the World Online, which retained it in Selenicereus.

Distribution and habitat
Deamia chontalensis is native to southwestern Mexico and Guatemala. In Oaxaca, Mexico, it is found in pine and oak forests.

References

Echinocereeae
Flora of Guatemala
Flora of Southwestern Mexico
Plants described in 1836